Douglas Island is a  island in British Columbia, Canada, located where the Fraser River and Pitt River meet. The island is uninhabited. The island was the property of Canadian Forest Products but the government bought it for $4.5 million. It became part of the city of Port Coquitlam in 1991.

History and name origin
The British Columbia Geographical Names Information System says about this island, which is one of two with this name in the province:
Presumably named after James Douglas (1803–1877), Hudson's Bay Company Chief Factor, 1840–58; founded Victoria 1843; governor, Vancouver Island 1851–64; governor, British Columbia 1858–64; KCB, 1863. All the lots on the island were purchased by him from the crown at auction, 6 October 1859, but crown grant was issued to his daughter Cecilia Helmcken, wife of Dr. J.S. Helmcken.

See also

Richmond, British Columbia
Sea Island, British Columbia
Iona Island (British Columbia)
Mitchell Island
Barnston Island

References

Uninhabited islands of British Columbia
Islands of the Fraser River
Landforms of Lower Mainland